Alba Iulia Cathedral may refer to one of two cathedrals in Alba Iulia, Romania:

St. Michael's Cathedral (Roman Catholic)
Coronation Cathedral (Romanian Orthodox)